Live on Breeze Hill was The Band bassist Rick Danko's third solo album, and the last released before his death in December 1999. It was credited to the "Rick Danko Band": Rick Danko, Garth Hudson & Aaron Hurwitz.
Focusing on an intimate show with Danko fronting a nine-piece group featuring three fellow members of The Band as well as auxiliary member Aaron Hurwitz, the album features a mostly predictable selection of live numbers from the glory days of The Band, with only "Crazy Mama" (a late period Band track), "Blaze of Glory" (a track Danko did with Danko/Fjeld/Andersen) and "Next Time You See Me" (the obligatory track featuring Hurwitz on lead vocal) coming from Danko's post-Band era.

"Sip The Wine", issued on Danko's 1977 debut, opens the album, coming not from the concert which makes up the rest of the album, but rather from the studio, an update that showed just how much the last twenty-some years had done to Danko.

Issued jointly by Woodstock Records and Breeze Hill Records, it was later made available as part of a two-disc set from Japan's Dreamsville Records, paired with Danko's posthumous Times Like These, featuring two additional tracks, an otherwise unavailable studio version of "Blind Willie McTell" and a radio edit of the opening "Sip the Wine".

Track listing
 "Sip the Wine" (Rick Danko) – 5:23
 "Twilight" (J. R. Robertson, R. Danko) – 5:16
 "Crazy Mama" (J. J. Cale) – 5:59
 "Stage Fright" (J. R. Robertson) – 4:55
 "Ophelia" (J. R. Robertson) – 3:51
 "Blaze of Glory" (Larry Keith, Danny Morrison, Johnny Slate) – 4:14
 "Next Time You See Me" (Earl Forest, Bill Harvey) – 4:51
 "Caledonia Mission" (J. R. Robertson) – 3:41
 "The Shape I'm In" (J. R. Robertson) – 4:21
 "Chest Fever" (J. R. Robertson) – 6:41
 "It Makes No Difference" (J. R. Robertson) – 6:12
 "Outro" – 1:01

Personnel 

Rick Danko – bass guitar, acoustic guitar, vocals
Garth Hudson – keyboards, organ, piano, soprano & alto saxophones, accordion
Aaron "Professor Louie" Hurwitz – piano, Hammond organ, accordion, vocals
Jim Weider – guitars
Roger Mason – electric & bass guitars
Randy Ciarlante – drums, percussion, vocals
Tom "Bones" Malone – trombone, baritone saxophone
Lenny Pickett – tenor saxophone, clarinet
Jim Hynes – trumpet

Rick Danko albums
1999 live albums